Earth's Skin is a 2004 Spanish drama film directed by Manuel Fernandez. It was entered into the 26th Moscow International Film Festival.

Cast
 Pilar Barrera
 Manuel de Blas as Mateo el enterrador
 Carmen del Valle as María
 Manuel Galiana as Salatiel
 Sergio Peris-Mencheta as Pablo

References

External links
 

2004 films
2004 drama films
Spanish drama films
2000s Spanish-language films
2000s Spanish films